This is a list of the members of the Parliament of Greenland in the 2009 to 2013 session.

List

Lists of members of the parliament of Greenland